The Malay Junk (German:Die malayische Dschonke) is a 1924 German silent crime film directed by Max Obal and starring Ernst Reicher and Alexandra Sorina. It features the fictional detective Stuart Webbs, who was popular during the silent era. It was made at the Emelka Studios in Munich.

Cast
 Ernst Reicher as Stuart Webbs
 Alexandra Sorina
 Ernst Bosser
 Claire Kronburger
 Arnold Marlé
 John Mylong
 Magda Simon

References

Bibliography
 Rainey, Buck. Serials and Series: A World Filmography, 1912-1956. McFarland, 2015.

External links

1924 films
Films of the Weimar Republic
Films directed by Max Obal
German silent feature films
1924 crime films
German black-and-white films
German crime films
Bavaria Film films
Films shot at Bavaria Studios
1920s German films